Grant Collins (born in Australia) is a professional drummer and drum clinician.

Graduating from the Queensland University of Technology with a Bachelor of Music in 1997, he was named 'Winner of the Australian Academy of Music Composition competition' during his first year of study. In '96, Grant's success in 'Australia's Best Up and Coming Drummer Competition' in Melbourne, led to worldwide sponsorships with major cymbal and drum companies, and also to clinics and workshops along the entire east coast of Australia. Grant also has a teaching studio in Brisbane and is Associate Lecturer in Jazz Percussion at the Central Queensland Conservatorium of Music.

Drum and cymbal setup
The kit  used by Grant is Australia's biggest drum kit setup. He currently endorses Pearl drums and Zildjian cymbals, and uses a Pearl Masters MMX kit when performing live. He has also designed his own signature sticks made by Vic Firth.

External links
Grant Collins's official website
Grant Collins Page on Drummerworld.com
Some photos of Grant Collins and other artists at the Australia's Ultimate Drummers Weekend 2006!
Vic Firth Website
Pearl Drums Official Website
Zildjian Cymbals Official Website

Australian drummers
Male drummers
Living people
Queensland University of Technology alumni
Year of birth missing (living people)